Mack is an unincorporated community and a U.S. Post Office located about 10 miles east of the Colorado/Utah border in Mesa County, Colorado, United States. Mack is part of the  Grand Junction Metropolitan Statistical Area.

Description
A post office called Mack has been in operation since 1904. with the ZIP Code 81525. The community was named after John W. Mack, a businessperson in the asphalt industry.

The Country Jam Ranch is located near the town of Mack and is known for being a Music Festival Destination. This is a permanent festival site created for music festivals, including Country Jam, an event that has been held since 1992 and one that draws thousands of country music fans to the area.

See also

 Grand Junction Metropolitan Statistical Area
 Old Spanish National Historic Trail
 List of cities and towns in Colorado

References

External links

Unincorporated communities in Mesa County, Colorado
Unincorporated communities in Colorado